Liu Yuan (born March 11, 1979) is a male amateur boxer from PR China. He qualified to compete at the 2004 Summer Olympics in the bantamweight division (– 54 kg) where he lost in the first round to Cuba's eventual gold medalist Guillermo Rigondeaux. Liu qualified for the 2004 Athens Games as a bantamweight by ending up in second place at the 1st AIBA Asian 2004 Olympic Qualifying Tournament in Guangzhou, PR China. In the final he lost to Pakistan's Mehrullah Lassi.

References

sports-reference

1979 births
Living people
Bantamweight boxers
Olympic boxers of China
Boxers at the 2004 Summer Olympics
Sportspeople from Guizhou
Chinese male boxers
21st-century Chinese people